The Brinkerhoff is an historic lodge in Grand Teton National Park on the shore of Jackson Lake. It is the last remaining example of a forest lease vacation lodge in the park. The log house and caretaker's lodge were designed by architect Jan Wilking of Casper, Wyoming and were built in 1946 in what was then U.S. Forest Service land for the Brinkerhoff family.  After the creation of Grand Teton National Park, the National Park Service acquired the property and used it for VIP housing.  Among the guests at the Brinkerhoff were John F. Kennedy and Richard M. Nixon. The lodge is also notable as a post-war adaptation of the rustic style of architecture. The interior is an intact example of this transitional style.

History
In the early days of Grand Teton National Park there were 111 forest leases, a legacy of U.S. Forest Service administration of lands that were incorporated into the new park. Ben Sheffield received a Forest Service lease for a parcel on Jackson Lake in 1930. The Sheffield house burned in the 1940s and the lease was purchased in 1947 from R. E. McConaughy by Zachery K. Brinkerhoff Sr. and his son. The Brinkerhoffs were the owners of an oil development company, the Brinkerhoff Drilling company. They hired Wiling to design their retreat, which was built by Scotty Sloten and four carpenters of Swedish descent from the Wind River valley, experienced in log construction. The house was furnished with furniture and accessories made by Western-style designer Thomas C. Molesworth. The house was sold to the Park Service in 1955, complete with the Molesworth furnishings. It received significant publicity as a result of the presidential visits. The National Park Service uses it for meetings and lodging.

Description
The Brinkerhoff is an early example of the conscious adaptation of rustic-style architecture that had been employed in public buildings around Jackson Hole to a private vacation house, in which the rustic style sets the tone of a rustic retreat. Jan Wilking's interpretation of the rustic style represents a transition from the heavy, consciously rustic style seen in public park buildings, to a cleaned-up, more finished and polished style, which would be further developed in vacation homes throughout the West. The main house is a partial two-story log building of dressed log construction, with vertical wood sheathing on the upper story. The front gable is sheathed in planks arranged in a V-pattern. A deck spans the full width of the west side of the house, overlooking Mount Moran and Jackson Lake, an early occurrence of a feature that has since become ubiquitous. The interior features a two-story living room. Interiors are finished with knotty pine paneling and polished wood floors. A smaller caretaker's cottage mirrors the style of the main house.

The Brinkerhoff was placed on the National Register of Historic Places on April 23, 1990.

See also
 Historical buildings and structures of Grand Teton National Park

References

External links

Grand Teton Historic Resource Study: Tourists National Park Service
 at the National Park Service's NRHP database
The Brinkerhoff at the Wyoming State Historic Preservation Office

Buildings and structures in Grand Teton National Park
Hotel buildings on the National Register of Historic Places in Wyoming
Rustic architecture in Wyoming
National Register of Historic Places in Grand Teton National Park
1946 establishments in Wyoming